Sanne van Paassen (born 27 October 1988) is a Dutch former professional cyclo-cross racing cyclist. In 2011, she won the UCI Cyclo-cross World Cup, after winning the Cyclo-cross Pilsen. She won several silver and bronze medals at the national and European cyclo-cross championships. She won 19 cyclo-cross races in her career.

On the road she became second behind Kirsten Wild in the 2013 Gent–Wevelgem. She rode her last cross in Oostmalle on 21 February 2016.

See also
 2012 Rabobank Women Cycling Team season
 2014 Rabo–Liv Women Cycling Team season
 2014 Boels Dolmans Cycling Team season
 2015 Boels Dolmans Cycling Team season

References

External links
 

1988 births
Living people
Dutch female cyclists
Cyclo-cross cyclists
People from Wageningen
Cyclists from Gelderland